Nanzheng District, formerly Nanzheng County, is a district of the city of Hanzhong, Shaanxi province, China, bordering Sichuan province to the south.

Administrative divisions
As 2019, Nanzheng District is divided to 2 subdistricts and 20 towns.
Subdistricts
 Hanshan Subdistrict
 Zhongsuoying Subdistrict

Towns

Climate

References

External links
Official website of Nanzheng Government

Districts of Shaanxi
Hanzhong